Juan Manuel Silva (born October 12, 1972 in Resistencia, Chaco), nicknamed el Pato ("the Duck") is an Argentine racing driver. In 1999 he was the champion of the TC 2000 competition and in 2005 he was the champion of the Turismo Carretera competition.

His father used to build racing cars for him. Already as a teenager he won two annual karting competitions (1986 and 1987). His last three titles are separated by six years each. He crowned himself champion of three different racing series in 1993, 1999 and 2005.

He was a driver of the Argentine Formula Renault before competing in the TC2000 series. He spent part of the 1990s in Japan and returned to Argentina and to TC 2000 and Turismo Carretera in 1998.

Silva spent the late 2000s in TC2000 driving at the Honda works team with great success. he was vice-champion in 2006 and 2009, 3rd in 2008 and 7th in 2007. He moved to Renault in 2010, where he had a disastrous season and finished 15th in the standings. Silva moved to the champion team Ford in 2011.

The driver has also competed at several editions of the Dakar Rally since 2011.

References

 Official website [in Spanish]

1972 births
Living people
People from Resistencia, Chaco
Turismo Carretera drivers
TC 2000 Championship drivers
Argentine racing drivers
Formula Renault Argentina drivers
Top Race V6 drivers
Dakar Rally drivers
Stock Car Brasil drivers
Japanese Touring Car Championship drivers
Sportspeople from Chaco Province

Súper TC 2000 drivers
Nürburgring 24 Hours drivers